The Larkin Building was an office building in Buffalo, New York, noted for innovations that included central air conditioning, built-in desk furniture, and suspended toilet partitions and bowls. Located at 680 Seneca Street, it was demolished in 1950.

Designed in 1903 by Frank Lloyd Wright and built in 1904-1906 for the Larkin Soap Company, the five-story dark-red brick building used pink-tinted mortar and steel-frame construction. Sculptor Richard Bock provided ornamentation for the building.

History
The Larkin Soap Company was founded in Buffalo in 1875 by John D. Larkin. Among the principals were Larkin, Elbert Hubbard, and Darwin D. Martin.  By the early years of the twentieth century, the company expanded beyond soap manufacturing into groceries, dry goods, china, and furniture.  Larkin became a pioneering, national mail-order house with branch stores in Buffalo, New York City and Chicago.  Due to their growth, the company decided to expand its complex in Buffalo, New York in 1902.  At the time it commissioned its headquarters, Larkin was prosperous and the high price for a well-designed, innovative building was not a barrier.  The company, known for its generous corporate culture, also commissioned Wright to design row houses for its workers, which were never built.

The first floor plan was of lobby and mail grouping, the second floor consisted of the typewriter operators' department, the third floor was the mail department, the fourth floor was the mail room, and the fifth floor consisted of a restaurant and kitchen, balconies, and a conservatory.

A 100-rank Möller pipe organ was housed in the central court with the pipe chambers located on the upper level and the console located in a shallow pit on the main floor.

Design
Floors, stairs, doors, window sills, partitions, desk tops and plumbing slabs were used with   magnesite for sound absorption. For floors, cement  was mixed with excelsior and poured, over a layer of felt to impart its resiliency. Magnesite was also used for sculptural decoration on the piers surrounding the light court and for panels and beams around the executive offices at the south end of the main floor. Wright designed much of the furniture, the chairs were made out of steel and hung from the tables to make cleaning the floors easy. The interior walls were made of semi-vitreous, hard, cream colored brick. A  light court was located in the center of the building which provided natural sunlight to all of the floors. Between its support piers ran fourteen sets of three inspiration words each, such as: .

Architectural historian Vincent Scully Jr. wrote of the structure:

Vertical brick piers and wall planes ... made possible the splendid integration of space, structure, and massing which Wright achieved in the Larkin Company Office Building at Buffalo, of 1904. In space the building was conceived of as facing inward, with a glass-roofed central hall rising the entire height and with horizontal office floors woven around it. The pattern of piers and walls which makes these spaces is clearly unified in both plan and section. The vertical piers rise uninterruptedly inside, and the horizontal planes of the office floors are kept back from their edges, so that they seem, once more, to be woven through them. ... At the same time, the stiff verticals of the interior of the Larkin Building continued to recall the challenge of the exterior, so that the occupant could not feel himself to be simply inside a shell. The sequence was an emotional one and a progress: challenge, bafflement, compression, search, and finally, surprise, release, transformation, and recall. It was almost a Baroque progression, but its methods were stiffer and harder, befitting the industrial program which they praised. Significantly enough, the building also recalled the Romantic-Classic projects of the first revolutionary architects of the later eighteenth century, particularly in the harshness of its forms but even in the rather underscaled world globes which were flaunted upon its exterior.

Wright said of the building:

Decline and demolition
In 1939 the Larkin Company made interior modifications and moved retail operations into the building.  In 1943, the firm's fortunes were in decline and it was forced to try to sell the building.

The Larkin Administration Building was foreclosed upon for back taxes in 1945 by the city of Buffalo.  The city tried to sell the building over the next five years and considered other uses.  In 1949 the building was sold to the Western Trading Corporation, which announced plans to demolish it for a truck stop.  It did so in 1950 despite countrywide editorial protests; however, no truck stop was ever constructed.

On November 16, 1949, architect J. Stanley Sharp stated in the New York Herald-Tribune: As an architect, I share the concern of many others over the destruction of Frank Lloyd Wright's world-famous office building in Buffalo. It is not merely a matter of sentiment; from a practical standpoint this structure can function efficiently for centuries. Modern engineering has improved upon the lighting and ventilation systems Mr. Wright used, but that is hardly excuse enough to efface the work of the man who successfully pioneered in the solving of such problems. The Larkin Building set a precedent for many an office building we admire today and should be regarded not as an outmoded utilitarian structure but as a monument, if not to Mr. Wright's creative imagination, to the inventiveness of American design.

The destruction of all but one pillar of the Larkin Administration Building is tragic in the architecture community. Hopefully, in the future we will consider the value of a significant building such as this, and work to preserve it.

Fate of the site
A single brick pier along a railroad embankment was one of the few features of Wright's original building that remained  after its demolition; the site became a parking lot with a marker and an illustrated educational panel.  In 2002, the Larkin Development Group began to acquire properties in the neighborhood, and revitalized the area over the next decade.

In 2015, the new owners of the Administration Building site, The Larkin Center of Commerce, erected a "ghost" pier at the Seneca Street side of the wall that connected two of the fence piers. The ghost pier was built of etched glass the same size and location as the brick fence pier that once stood in its place. The ghost pier is supported on the concrete and stone base of the original construction. Inside the glass pier a small section of off white brick is visible. These are reclaimed bricks from the interior of the building. The sidewalks on Seneca Street reflect the locations of the major features of the building including the width of the atrium, fence piers and main entry. Granite markers inlaid in the sidewalk mark these locations. Two additional interpretive markers flank the ghost pier.

Extensive Larkin Company records and photographs survive in the library collection of the Buffalo History Museum.

See also
 Architecture of Buffalo, New York
 Larkin Soap Company
 Larkin Terminal Warehouse
 Larkinville
 Frank Lloyd Wright

Notes

References

 Storrer, William Allin. The Frank Lloyd Wright Companion. University of Chicago Press, 2006,  (S.093)

External links

"Frank Lloyd Wright and His Forgotten Larkin Building", article with images at the historical structure blog, Bearings
"The Guggenheim Museum Turns 50", 2009 Newsweek article by Cathleen McGuigan that compares the Larkin Building with the Guggenheim
Larkin Administration Building, photos
Larkin Building, plans, commentary and links at GreatBuildings.com
"The Larkin Building, Buffalo, NY: History of the Demolition", 1978 essay by Jerome Puma
"Work of Art: Demolition of Larkin Building was Key Loss for Preservation Advocates", 2004 article by G. Scott Thomas at Buffalo Business First
 Frank Lloyd Wright: The Lost Works - Larkin Administration Building, Animation
Computer recreation, Photorealistic recreation made by computer

Frank Lloyd Wright buildings
Architecture of Buffalo, New York
Buildings and structures in Buffalo, New York
Buildings and structures completed in 1906
Buildings and structures demolished in 1950
Demolished buildings and structures in New York (state)
Headquarters in the United States
Modernist architecture in New York (state)
1906 establishments in New York (state)